The Fogo wall gecko (Tarentola fogoensis) is a species of geckos in the family Phyllodactylidae. The species is endemic to Cape Verde, where it is found on the island of Fogo. The species was first described and named in 2012.

Etymology
The specific name fogoensis refers to the island where it occurs, Fogo.

References

fogoensis
Geckos of Africa
Endemic vertebrates of Cape Verde
Fauna of Fogo, Cape Verde
Reptiles described in 2012